Thoma (died 1127), also called Habiba of Valencia, was an Arab Andalusian woman scholar known for writing several authoritative books on grammar and jurisprudence. Very little is known about her life.

References

12th-century people from al-Andalus
12th-century women writers
12th-century Spanish writers
People from Valencia
1127 deaths
Year of birth unknown
Medieval Spanish women writers
12th-century Spanish women
Linguists